World Series of Fighting 21: Palmer vs. Horodecki was a mixed martial arts event held on  in Edmonton, Alberta, Canada. This event aired on NBCSN in the U.S and on Fight Network in Canada.

Background
The main event was originally scheduled to feature a middleweight fight between Yushin Okami and WSOF Canadian Welterweight Champion Ryan Ford. However, Ford was forced out of the bout due to an injury and the pairing was scrapped.

The main event was then changed to a WSOF Featherweight Championship fight between champion Lance Palmer and WEC & Bellator MMA veteran Chris Horodecki.

The co-main event featured a WSOF Heavyweight Championship fight between champion Smealinho Rama and Bellator MMA veteran Blagoy Ivanov.

Results

See also 
 List of WSOF champions
 List of WSOF events

References

Events in Edmonton
World Series of Fighting events
2015 in mixed martial arts